Cheshmeh Khurzan (also Romanized as Cheshmeh Khūrzan; also known as Chashmeh and Cheshmeh Moshg Abad) is a village in Moshkabad Rural District, in the Central District of Arak County, Markazi Province, Iran. At the 2006 census, its population was 341, in 124 families.

References 

Populated places in Arak County